Brandyn Dombrowski (born April 3, 1985) is a professional American football offensive tackle who is currently a free agent. He was signed by the Chargers as an undrafted free agent in 2008. He played college football at San Diego State.

Professional career

San Diego Chargers
Dombrowski spent his rookie season as a practice squad player. 2009 marked his first year as a starter, Dombrowski played in his first career game at right guard against the Oakland Raiders. He started week 2 against the Ravens for his first career start in place of the injured rookie Louis Vasquez. He has also practiced at both left and right tackle.
Dombrowski was named the starting Left Tackle for the 2010 season. On August 25, 2013, he was cut by the Chargers.

Las Vegas Outlaws
On February 9, 2015, Dombrowski was assigned to the Las Vegas Outlaws of the Arena Football League (AFL).

Early life

Dombrowski graduated from Green Valley High School in Henderson, Nevada in 2003 where he also played football.

References

External links
San Diego Chargers bio
San Diego State Aztecs bio

1985 births
Living people
Players of American football from Buffalo, New York
American football offensive guards
San Diego State Aztecs football players
San Diego Chargers players
Las Vegas Outlaws (arena football) players
Green Valley High School (Nevada) alumni